Rhinotyphlops scorteccii, commonly known as Scortecci's blind snake, is a species of snake in the family Typhlopidae. The species is endemic to Somalia.

Etymology
The specific name, scorteccii, is in honor of Italian herpetologist Giuseppe Scortecci (1898-1973).

Reproduction
R. scorteccii is oviparous.

References

Further reading
Broadley, Wallach V (2007). "A review of East and Central African species of Letheobia Cope, revived from the synonymy of Rhinotyphlops Fitzinger, with descriptions of five new species (Serpentes: Typhlopidae)". Zootaxa 1515: 31–68. ("Letheobia scortecci [sic]", new combination).
Gans C, Laurent RF, Pandit H (1965). "Notes on a herpetological collection from the Somali Republic". Annales du Musée Royal de l'Afrique Centrale, Série in Octavo, Science Zoologique, Tervuren 134: 1–93. (Typhlops scorteccii, new species, p. 56).
Hedges SB, Marion AB, Lipp KM, Marin J, Vidal N (2014). "A taxonomic framework for typhlopid snakes from the Caribbean and other regions (Reptilia, Squamata)". Caribbean Herpetology 49: 1–61. ("Rhinotyphlops scortecci [sic]", p. 31).

Endemic fauna of Somalia
Typhlopidae
Reptiles described in 1965